(The Tonite Show) Thuggin' & Mobbin'  is the seventh studio album by rapper Yukmouth. It was released on January 12, 2011, through Smoke-a-Lot Records.

Track listing

References

External links 
 Smokelotrecords.com Official Label Website
 
 
 
 

2012 albums
Yukmouth albums